Wilco Kelderman (born 25 March 1991) is a Dutch professional road bicycle racer who rides for UCI WorldTeam .

Professional career

Born in Amersfoort, Kelderman finished in seventh position in the general classification of the 2014 Giro d'Italia. He broke his collarbone in the ensuing off-season while training. He was named in the start list for the 2015 Tour de France and finished in ninth place in the opening individual time trial. The following year he rode the Tour de France and placed 32nd overall.

He finished in the top ten of the Vuelta a España in three successive editions, between 2017 and 2019. At the 2020 Giro d'Italia, held in October due to the COVID-19 pandemic in Italy, he held the overall lead after stages 18 and 19, but lost time to Tao Geoghegan Hart and Jai Hindley; as a result, he finished in third overall.

Kelderman joined the  team in 2021 on a two-year contract. He recorded top-five overall finishes at the Volta a Catalunya, the Critérium du Dauphiné and the Tour de France in his first season for the team. In his second season, he finished third at the Circuito de Getxo.

In August 2022, it was announced that Kelderman was to join  from the 2023 season, on a three-year contract.

Major results

2008
 1st  Time trial, National Junior Road Championships
 2nd Overall Giro della Lunigiana
 3rd Overall Trofeo Karlsberg
1st Young rider classification
2009
 4th Overall 3 Giorni Orobica
1st Stage 3
 10th Overall Trofeo Karlsberg
2010
 1st  Overall Tour Alsace
1st Stage 5
 3rd Overall Le Triptyque des Monts et Châteaux
 3rd Overall Tour du Gévaudan Languedoc-Roussillon
 5th Overall Istrian Spring Trophy
 5th Overall Ringerike GP
 5th Scandinavian Race Uppsala
 8th Overall Circuit des Ardennes
 8th Rund um den Finanzplatz Eschborn–Frankfurt U23
 9th Rogaland GP
 10th Overall Tour de l'Avenir
 10th Grand Prix des Marbriers
2011
 1st  Time trial, National Under-23 Road Championships
 1st  Overall Tour of Norway
1st  Young rider classification
 1st  Overall Thüringen Rundfahrt der U23
1st Stages 5 (ITT) & 6
 1st Prologue Tour de l'Ain
 5th Rogaland GP
 8th Route Adélie de Vitré
2012
 6th Rund um Köln
 7th Overall Tour of California
1st  Young rider classification
 7th Overall Danmark Rundt
1st  Young rider classification
 8th Overall Critérium du Dauphiné
1st  Young rider classification
 10th Overall Vuelta a Andalucía
2013
 1st  Overall Danmark Rundt
1st  Points classification
1st  Young rider classification
1st Stage 5 (ITT)
 5th Overall Tour de Romandie
1st  Young rider classification
 6th Overall Tour Down Under
 7th Overall Eneco Tour
2014
 4th Overall Critérium du Dauphiné
1st  Young rider classification
 5th Overall Volta ao Algarve
 5th Overall Tour of Utah
 7th Overall Giro d'Italia
2015
 1st  Time trial, National Road Championships
 3rd Overall Eneco Tour
 6th Grand Prix Cycliste de Montréal
 8th Volta Limburg Classic
 9th Overall Volta a Catalunya
1st  Young rider classification
 10th La Flèche Wallonne
2016
 2nd Overall Tour du Poitou Charentes
1st  Young rider classification
 3rd Time trial, National Road Championships
 4th Overall Vuelta a Andalucía
 6th Overall Eneco Tour
 8th Overall Tour de Suisse
 10th Overall Tour of the Basque Country
2017
 UCI Road World Championships
1st  Team time trial
7th Time trial 
 4th Overall Vuelta a España
 4th Overall Tour de Pologne
 7th Overall Tour de Romandie
 9th Overall Tour Down Under
2018
 2nd  Team time trial, UCI Road World Championships
 2nd Overall Abu Dhabi Tour
 3rd Time trial, National Road Championships
 5th Overall Tour de Suisse
 6th Milano–Torino
 6th Tre Valli Varesine
 10th Overall Vuelta a España
2019
 5th Overall UAE Tour
 7th Overall Vuelta a España
2020
 3rd Overall Giro d'Italia
Held  after Stages 18–19
 4th Overall Tirreno–Adriatico
 5th Overall Tour de la Provence
 6th Overall UAE Tour
 7th Overall Tour de Pologne
2021
 4th Overall Critérium du Dauphiné
 5th Overall Tour de France
 5th Overall Volta a Catalunya
 10th Overall Tour de Romandie
2022
 3rd Circuito de Getxo
 9th Overall Vuelta a Burgos

General classification results timeline

Classics results timeline

References

External links 

 
 
 
 
 
 
 
 

1991 births
Living people
Dutch male cyclists
UCI Road World Championships cyclists for the Netherlands
Sportspeople from Amersfoort
Olympic cyclists of the Netherlands
Cyclists at the 2020 Summer Olympics
21st-century Dutch people
Cyclists from Utrecht (province)